Henna Savikuja (born 28 March 1978) is a Finnish retired ice hockey player. She competed in the women's tournament at the 2002 Winter Olympics. Playing with the Finnish national team she won bronze medals at the IIHF World Women's Championships in 2000 and 2004.

References

External links 

1978 births
Living people
Finnish women's ice hockey forwards
Olympic ice hockey players of Finland
Ice hockey players at the 2002 Winter Olympics
People from Kalix Municipality